Malta will compete at the 2022 World Athletics Championships in Eugene, United States, from 15 to 24 July 2022. It has entered 1 athlete.

Results

Women 

 Field events

References 

Nations at the 2022 World Athletics Championships
2022
World Athletics